The 2014 KNSB Dutch Allround Championships in speed skating were held at the Olympic Stadium ice stadium in Amsterdam, Netherlands from 28 February to 2 March 2014.  The tournament was part of the 2013–2014 speed skating season. Koen Verweij and Yvonne Nauta won the allround titles.

Schedule

Medalists

Allround

Distance

Classification

Men's allround

Women's allround

Source:

References

KNSB Dutch Allround Championships
KNSB Dutch Allround Championships
2014 Allround
KNSB Dutch Allround Championships, 2014
January 2014 sports events in Europe
2010s in Amsterdam